Thomas Leonard Hayman (24 May 1904 – 2 January 1962) was a New Zealand politician of the National Party and a farmer.

Biography

Hayman was born in 1904 in Willowbridge near Waimate. He received his education at Nukuroa School and Waimate High School, and left school aged 17 to help on the family farm. Between 1926 and 1945, he worked as a contractor in farming. He was active with several organisations, including the South Canterbury Power Board (where he served as deputy-chairman), chairman of the South Canterbury Federated Farmers, and treasurer of the Methodist Church Trust at Nukuroa. From 1941 to 1949, he was director of the Studholme sale yards.

He represented the Otago electorates of Oamaru from 1949 to 1957, and then Waitaki from 1957 to 1962, when he died. In 1949, he defeated Labour's Arnold Nordmeyer.

He was a cabinet minister from 1960 to 1962; Postmaster-General from 12 December 1960 to 2 May 1961, then Minister of Agriculture from 2 May 1961 until 2 January 1962.

Hayman died suddenly of a heart attack on 2 January 1962.

Notes

References

|-

|- 

1904 births
1962 deaths
New Zealand National Party MPs
Members of the Cabinet of New Zealand
Members of the New Zealand House of Representatives
New Zealand MPs for South Island electorates
People from Waimate
20th-century New Zealand politicians